The Other Backward Class is a collective term used by the Government of India to classify castes which are educationally or socially backward.  It is one of several official classifications of the population of India, along with General castes, Scheduled Castes and Scheduled Tribes (SCs and STs). The OBCs were found to comprise 52% of the country's population by the Mandal Commission report of 1980, and were determined to be 41% in 2006 when the National Sample Survey Organisation took place. There is substantial debate over the exact number of OBCs in India; it is generally estimated to be sizable, but many believe that it is higher than the figures quoted by either the Mandal Commission or the National Sample Survey.

In the Indian Constitution, OBCs are described as socially and educationally backward classes (SEBC), and the Government of India is enjoined to ensure their social and educational development — for example, the OBCs are entitled to 27% reservations in public sector employment and higher education. The list of OBCs maintained by the Indian Ministry of Social Justice and Empowerment is dynamic, with castes and communities being added or removed depending on social, educational and economic factors. In a reply to a question in Lok Sabha, Union Minister Jitendra Singh informed that as in January 2016, the percentage of OBCs in central government services is 21.57% and has shown an increasing trend since September, 1993. Likewise, in 2015, at educational institutions, funds meant for OBC students under the reservation policy were not used properly or were underused in cases of upgrading infrastructure as well as in violation of faculty recruitment of OBCs according to the 49% reservation policy.

Until 1985, the affairs of the Backward Classes were looked after by the Backward Classes Cell in the Ministry of Home Affairs. A separate Ministry of Welfare was established in 1985 (renamed in 1998 to the Ministry of Social Justice and Empowerment) to attend to matters relating to Scheduled Castes, Scheduled Tribes and OBCs. The Backward Classes Division of the Ministry looks after the policy, planning and implementation of programmes relating to social and economic empowerment of OBCs, and matters relating to two institutions set up for the welfare of OBCs, the National Backward Classes Finance and Development Corporation and the National Commission for Backward Classes.

Government obligation
Under Article 340 of the Indian Constitution, it is obligatory for the government to promote the welfare of the OBCs.

A 1992 decision of the Supreme Court of India resulted in a requirement that 27% of civil service positions be reserved for members of OBCs. In a reply to a question in Lok Sabha, Union Minister Jitendra Singh informed that as in January 2016, the percentage of OBCs in central government jobs is 21.57%.

Socio-economic status
There existed huge disparity among various castes and communities classified as Other Backward Class, even prior to the implementation of the reservation policy in government jobs and educational institutions, as per the recommendation of Mandal Commission report. While, a major section of Other Backward Castes was extremely backward, there existed a section, which owned considerable land and employed Scheduled Castes (SC) as agricultural labourers. In the agitation for implementation of the report of Mandal Commission, Scheduled Castes supported the Other Backward Castes, but after the implementation of these recommendations on the direction of Supreme Court of India, the tension between a section of OBCs and SCs increased.

In some states of North India, the Yadavs, Kurmis and the Koeris, which were called "upper-OBC", were well off, due to ownership of sizeable amount of land. The abolition of Zamindari system in post independence India raised many of the members of these communities to the status of landlords. Following the Green Revolution in India, their landholdings and economic prosperity increased further; they acquired education and became an active participants in the government jobs. Further, after the Mandal agitation subsided in North India, OBC leaders gained political power to outnumber the upper caste legislators in most of the north indian states. This led to formation of OBC led government in many states of North India. They also ended up by claiming the high ritual status, which is defined as Sanskritisation.

However, the OBC consolidation in some of the states of north India like Bihar, left  many other OBC communities away from the development process. The political and economic prosperity was cornered by the dominant Backward Castes like Koeri, Kurmi and Yadav; this was witnessed in formation of political blocs in the state after 1995, in which, either side was dominated by these three castes.

Demographics

Kalelkar Commission

Below is the distribution of population of each religion by caste categories, obtained from merged sample of Schedule 1 and Schedule 10 of available data from the National Sample Survey Organisation 55th (1999–2000) and National Sample Survey Organisation 61st Rounds (2004–05) Round Survey.

The First Backward Classes Commission was established by a presidential order on 29 January 1953 under the chairmanship of Kaka Kalelkar, and submitted its report on 30 March 1955. It had prepared a list of 2,399 backward castes or communities for the entire country, of which 837 had been classified as the "most backward". Some of the most notable recommendations of the Kalelkar commission were:
 Undertaking caste-wise enumeration of population in the census of 1961;
 Relating social backwardness of a class to its low position in the traditional caste hierarchy of Indian society;
 Treating all women as a class as "backward";
 Reservation of 70 per cent seats in all technical and professional institutions for qualified students of backward classes.
 Reservation of vacancies in all government services and local bodies for other backward classes.

The commission in its final report recommended "caste as the criteria" to determine backwardness. However, the report was not accepted by the government, which feared that the backward classes excluded from the caste and communities selected by the commission might not be considered, and those in most need would be swamped by the multitudes, thus receiving insufficient attention.

Mandal Commission

The decision to set up a second backward classes commission was made official by the president on 1 January 1979. The commission popularly known as the Mandal Commission, its chairman being B. P. Mandal, submitted a report in December 1980 that stated that the population of OBCs, which includes both Hindus and non-Hindus, was around 52 per cent of the total population according to the Mandal Commission. The number of backward castes and communities was 3,743 in the initial list of Mandal Commission set up in 1979–80. The number of backward castes in Central list of OBCs has now increased to 5,013 (without the figures for most of the Union Territories) in 2006 as per National Commission for Backward Classes. Mandal Commission developed 11 indicators or criteria to identify OBCs, of which four were economic.

The National Sample Survey puts the figure at 41%. There is substantial debate over the exact number of OBCs in India, with census data compromised by partisan politics. It is generally estimated to be sizable, but lower than the figures quoted by either the Mandal Commission or and National Sample Survey.

27 percent of reservation was recommended owing to the legal constraint that the total quantum of reservation should not exceed 50 percent. States which have already introduced reservation for OBC exceeding 27 per cent will not be affected by this recommendation. With this general recommendation the commission proposed the following overall scheme of reservation for OBC:

 Candidates belonging to OBC recruited on the basis of merit in an open competition should not be adjusted against their reservation quota of 27 per cent.
 The above reservation should also be made applicable to promotion quota at all levels.
 Reserved quota remaining unfilled should be carried forward for a period of three years and de-reserved thereafter.
 Relaxation in the upper age limit for direct recruitment should be extended to the candidates of OBC in the same manner as done in the case of scheduled castes and scheduled tribes.
 A roster system for each category of posts should be adopted by the concerned authorities in the same manner as presently done in respect of scheduled caste and scheduled tribe candidates.

These recommendations in total are applicable to all recruitment to public sector undertakings, both under the central and state governments as well as to nationalised banks. All private sector undertakings which have received financial assistance from the government in one form or other should also be obliged to recruit personnel on the aforesaid basis. All universities and affiliated colleges should also be covered by the above scheme of reservation. Although education is considered an important factor to bring a desired social change, "educational reform" was not within the terms of reference of this commission. To promote literacy the following measures were suggested:

 An intensive time-bound programme for adult education should be launched in selected pockets with high concentration of OBC population.
 Residential schools should be set up in these areas for backward class students to provide a climate specially conducive to serious studies. All facilities in these schools including board and lodging should be provided free of cost to attract students from poor and backward class homes.
 Separate hostels for OBC students with above facilities will have to be provided.
 Vocational training was considered imperative.
 It was recommended that seats should be reserved for OBC students in all scientific, technical and professional institutions run by the central as well as state governments. The quantum of reservation should be the same as in the government services, i.e. 27 per cent.

Sub-categorisation
In October 2017, President of India Ram Nath Kovind notified a five-member Commission headed by Delhi High Court's former Chief Justice G. Rohini under Article 340 of Indian Constitution, to explore the idea of OBC sub-categorisation. The National Commission for Backward Classes had recommended it in 2011 and a standing committee too had repeated this. The committee has a three-point mandate:
 To examine the "extent of inequitable distribution of benefits of reservation" among various castes and communities that come under the Central OBC list.
 To work out the mechanism, criteria and parameters for the actual sub-categorisation. The actual OBC reservation will continue to be 27% and within this the committee will have to do the re-arranging.
 Bringing order to the Central list of OBCs by removing any repetitions.

The committee will have to deliver the report in 12 weeks of its constitution. The lower OBCs form around 35% of the population in Uttar Pradesh. OBC sub-categorisation have already been implemented at State level by 11 states : West Bengal, Tamil Nadu, Maharashtra, Andhra Pradesh, Telangana, Karnataka, Jharkhand, Bihar, Jammu and kashmir region and Haryana, and the union territory of Puducherry. The term of the commission has been extended to 31 May 2019.  Its report stated that prime beneficiaries of 97% OBC reservation includes Yadav, Kurmi, Jat (Jats of Rajasthan except those of Bharatpur and Dholpur district are in Central OBC list), Saini, Thevar, Ezhava and Vokkaliga castes.

Legal disputes

Creamy layer and Indra Sawhney vs Union of India
The term creamy layer was first coined by Justice Krishna Iyer in 1975 in State of Kerala vs NM Thomas case, wherein he observed that "the danger of 'reservation', it seems to me, is three-fold. Its benefits, by and large, are snatched away by the top creamy layer of the 'backward' caste or class, thus keeping the weakest among the weak always weak and leaving the fortunate layers to consume the whole cake". 1992 Indra Sawhney & Others v. Union of India judgment laid down the limits of the state's powers: it upheld the ceiling of 50 per cent quotas, emphasized the concept of "social backwardness", and prescribed 11 indicators to ascertain backwardness. The nine-Judge Bench judgement also established the concept of qualitative exclusion, such as "creamy layer". The creamy layer is only applicable in the case of Other Backward Castes and not applicable on other group like SC or ST. The creamy layer criteria were introduced at Rs 100,000 in 1993, and revised to Rs 250,000 in 2004, Rs 450,000 in 2008 and Rs 600,000 in 2013. In October 2015, National Commission for Backward Classes proposed that a person belonging to OBC with an annual family income of up to Rs 1.5 million should be considered as minimum ceiling for OBC. NCBC also recommended sub-division of OBCs into 'backward', 'more backward' and 'extremely backward' blocs and divide 27% quota amongst them in proportion to their population, to ensure that stronger OBCs don't corner the quota benefits. In August 2017, NDA government announced the creamy layer ceiling in the OBC category from getting reservation in jobs, has been raised from Rs 6 lakh a year to Rs 8 lakh.

Supreme Court interim stay
On 29 March 2007, the Supreme Court of India, as an interim measure, stayed the law providing for 27 percent reservation for Other Backward Classes in educational institutions like IITs and IIMs. This was done in response to a public interest litigation — Ashoka Kumar Thakur vs. Union of India. The Court held that the 1931 census could not be a determinative factor for identifying the OBCs for the purpose of providing reservation. The court also observed, "Reservation cannot be permanent and appear to perpetuate backwardness".

Supreme Court verdict
On 10 April 2008 the Supreme Court of India upheld the government's initiative of 27% OBC quotas in government-funded institutions. The Court has categorically reiterated its prior stand that those considered part of the "Creamy layer" should be excluded by government-funded institutions and by private institutions from the scope of the reservation policy. The verdict produced mixed reactions from supporting and opposing quarters.

Several criteria to identify the portion of the population comprising the "creamy layer" have been recommended, including the following:
 Children of those with family income above  250,000 a year, and then  450,000 a year  and now  800,000 a year, should be considered creamy layer, and excluded from the reservation quota.
 Children of doctors, engineers, chartered accountants, actors, consultants, media professionals, writers, bureaucrats, defence officers of colonel and equivalent rank or higher, high court and Supreme Court judges, and all central and state government Class A and B officials should be excluded.
 The Court has requested Parliament to exclude the children of MPs and MLAs as well.

Supreme Court conclusions from Ashoka Kumar Thakur vs. Union of India

 The Constitution (Ninety-Third Amendment) Act, 2006 does not violate the "basic structure" of the Constitution so far as it relates to the state maintained institutions and aided educational institutions. Question whether the Constitution (Ninety-Third Amendment) Act, 2006 would be constitutionally valid or not so far as "private unaided" educational institutions are concerned, is left open to be decided in an appropriate case.
 The "creamy layer" principle is one of the parameters to identify backward classes. Therefore, principally, the "creamy layer" principle cannot be applied to STs and SCs, as SCs and STs are separate classes by themselves.
 Preferably there should be a review after ten years to take note of the change of circumstances.
 A graduation (not technical graduation) or professional course deemed to be educationally forward.
 Principle of exclusion of creamy layer applicable to OBC's.
 The Central Government shall examine as to the desirability of fixing a cut off marks in respect of the candidates belonging to the Other Backward Classes (OBCs) to balance reservation with other societal interests and to maintain standards of excellence. This would ensure quality and merit would not suffer. If any seats remain vacant after adopting such norms they shall be filled up by candidates from general categories.
 So far as determination of backward classes is concerned, a notification should be issued by the Union of India. This can be done only after exclusion of the creamy layer for which necessary data must be obtained by the Central Government from the State Governments and Union Territories. Such Notification is open to challenge on the ground of wrongful exclusion or inclusion. Norms must be fixed keeping in view the peculiar features in different States and Union Territories. There has to be proper identification of Other Backward Classes (OBCs). For identifying backward classes, the Commission set up pursuant to the directions of this Court in Indra Sawhney 1 has to work more effectively and not merely decide applications for inclusion or exclusion of castes.
 The Parliament should fix a deadline by which time free and compulsory education will have reached every child. This must be done within six months, as the right to free and compulsory education is perhaps the most important of all the fundamental rights (Art.21 A). For without education, it becomes extremely difficult to exercise other fundamental rights.
 If material is shown to the Central Government that the Institution deserves to be included in the Schedule (institutes which are excluded from reservations) of The Central Educational Institutions (Reservation in Admission) Act, 2006 (No. 5 of 2007), the Central Government must take an appropriate decision on the basis of materials placed and on examining the concerned issues as to whether Institution deserves to be included in the Schedule of the said act as provided in Sec 4 of the said act.
 Held that the determination of SEBCs is done not solely based on caste and hence, the identification of SEBCs does not violate Article 15(1) of the Constitution.

Supreme Court scrapped Jat Reservations in Central OBCs list
In March 2015, Supreme Court of India scrapped Jat Reservations saying that Jats are not socially and economically backward in reference with National Commission for Backward Classes' (NCBC) opinion. Supreme Court judgement quashed the proposed inclusion of Jats in Central list of OBCs on the basis that Jats are already given OBC status in 9 States. On 21 July 2015, Supreme Court rejected Centre's review plea for its verdict of quashing Jat reservation in OBCs.

Christians
The Karnataka State Government has issued notification granting OBC reservation benefits to Brahmin Christian, Kuruba Christian, Madiga Christian, Akkasali Christian, Sudri Christian, Scheduled Caste converted to Christianity, Setty Balija Christian, Nekara Christian, Paravar Christian and Lambani Christian.

The Kerala government grants OBC reservation benefits to Latin Catholics of Kerala, Anglo Indians and Nadar Christians included in South India United Church (SIUC).

The Government of Maharashtra grants OBC reservation benefits to East Indians Catholics.

Politically important social groups listed as OBC
 Koli in the National as well as state list of Goa, Gujarat, Daman and Diu, Dadra and Nagar Haveli, Karnataka, Maharashtra,
 Rajputs in National as well as State OBC list of Karnataka.
 Khatris in the National as well as State OBC list of Tamil Nadu. Khatris in the state OBC list of Maharastra.
 Aras (Urs) community of the Mysore Wodeyars in Karnataka.
 Kathis in the central list of Gujarat.
 Ahoms in the central list.
 Jats in state list of Rajasthan, Himachal Pradesh, Delhi, Uttarakhand, Uttar Pradesh, Madhya Pradesh, Punjab and Chhattisgarh. However only the Jats of Rajasthan – excluding those of Bharatpur district and Dholpur district – are entitled to reservation of central government jobs under the OBC reservation.
 Yadavs in many states list except Punjab.
 Kushwahas in many states and national list

Listed Brahmins & other priestly communities
 Rajapur Saraswat Brahmins in the states of Maharashtra, Kerala and Karnataka.
 Bhargav Dakaut or Joshi Brahmins in the states of Rajasthan, Madhya Pradesh, Haryana, Punjab, and Delhi
 Kattaha Brahmin in the state of Rajasthan.
 Saurashtra Brahmins in the states of Tamil Nadu and Kerala.
 Goswami Brahman in some states ( Assam, Himachal Pradesh, Jammu Kashmir, Haryana, Punjab, Bihar central list in notified general categories) Uttar Pradesh, Uttarakhand Jharkhand, Rajasthan, Gujarat in obc.
 Dhiman and Jangid Brahmins in the states of Chandigarh, Delhi, Haryana, Himachal Pradesh, Punjab, Uttar Pradesh, Uttarakhand.
 Bairagi in the states of Chandigarh, Chhattisgarh, Delhi, Haryana, Himachal Pradesh, Jharkhand, Madhya Pradesh, Odisha, Punjab, Uttar Pradesh, Uttarakhand.
 Gurav or shaiv Brahmin in the state of Maharashtra.

Lists

Lists of OBCs are maintained by both the National Commission for Backward Classes and the individual states. The central list does not always reflect the state lists, which can differ significantly. A community identified as a nationally recognized OBC in the NCBC central list may be so recognized only in specific states or only in limited areas within specific states. Occasionally, it is not an entire community that is thus classified but rather some parts within it.

See also

 Caste system in India
 Economically Weaker Section
 Forward Castes
 Jat reservation agitation
 List of Muslim Other Backward Classes communities in India
 List of Scheduled Castes
 List of Scheduled Tribes in India
 Patidar reservation agitation
 Socio Economic and Caste Census 2011
 Upper Backward Castes
 Varna (Hinduism)

References

External links

Ministry of Social Justice & Empowerment, Government of India
National Commission for Backward Classes, central list by state

 
Reservation in India
Caste system in India
Political terminology in India